Abrus sambiranensis is a plant in the legume family Fabaceae, native to Madagascar. It grows as a herb or vine.

Distribution and habitat
Abrus sambiranensis is endemic to Madagascar, where it is confined to Antsiranana and Mahajanga provinces in the north of the country. It is found from sea level to  altitude.

Conservation
, there were only four known subpopulations of Abrus sambiranensis. Threats to the species include from soil erosion due to deforestation and from harvesting for use in traditional medicine. Two subpopulations are present in Manongarivo Special Reserve where the species is conserved.

References

Faboideae
Endemic flora of Madagascar
Plants described in 1952